The Gelmer Funicular is a cable railway in the canton of Bern, Switzerland. It links a lower terminus at Handegg, in the Haslital (the valley of the upper Aar River), with an upper terminus at the Gelmersee lake, 448 m above.

With an incline of 106% (or 47°), Gelmerbahn was the steepest funicular in Switzerland and Europe, until the opening of the new Stoos Funicular in 2017. The Handegg terminus of the line is close to the road over the Grimsel Pass. It is accessible by car and by an infrequent PostBus service. It is technically not a funicular, which has two cars that counterbalance each other, but is propelled by a winch.

History
The funicular was originally built to facilitate the construction of the Gelmersee, a reservoir, constructed in 1926 in order to exploit the hydroelectric resources of the area and was not opened for public use until 2001. The line is owned and operated by Kraftwerke Oberhasli AG (KWO) which owns the power station.

Operation
The line operates from the beginning of June through to mid-October, in daylight hours only. It has the following parameters:

See also 
 List of funicular railways
 List of funiculars in Switzerland

References

External links 

 The Gelmerbahn on KWO's web site
 The Gelmerbahn's entry on the Swiss Inventory of Ropeways
 Images

Funicular railways in Switzerland
Metre gauge railways in Switzerland
Transport in the canton of Bern